Events from the year 1328 in the Kingdom of Scotland.

Incumbents
Monarch – Robert I

Events
17 March – King Robert the Bruce signs the Treaty of Edinburgh–Northampton that marks English acceptance of Scottish independence.
1 May – Treaty of Edinburgh–Northampton is ratified by the English parliament meeting in Northampton.
17 July – fulfilling one part of the Treaty of Edinburgh-Northampton, David II of Scotland, four-year-old son of King Robert, and Joan of the Tower, seven-year-old sister of Edward III, are married at Berwick.

Births
Archibald Douglas, 3rd Earl of Douglas ("Archibald the Grim", "Black Archibald"), magnate and warrior (d. 1400)

See also

 Timeline of Scottish history

References

 
Years of the 14th century in Scotland
Wars of Scottish Independence